Keiferia altisolani is a moth in the family Gelechiidae. It was described by Kieffer in 1937. It is found in North America, where it has been recorded from California.

The length of the forewings is 5–6 mm. The forewings are grey, mottled with light and dark grey, with yellowish-orange lines at the apex. The hindwings are light grey.

The larvae feed on Solanum xanti. They mine the leaves of their host plant, or tie the leaves together. Full-grown larvae reach a length of 8-8.5 mm. They have a green to bluish-purple body and blackish head.

References

Keiferia
Moths described in 1937